Aligarh Lok Sabha Constituency is a Lok Sabha parliamentary constituency in Uttar Pradesh.

Assembly Segments

Members of Parliament

Election results

General Elections 2019

General Elections 2014

See also
 Aligarh
 Aligarh Assembly constituency
 List of Constituencies of the Lok Sabha

References

Lok Sabha constituencies in Uttar Pradesh
Politics of Aligarh district